Songshark is a term for a dishonest music publisher, whose main source of income is the naivete of new songwriters, whom they charge for services a reputable publisher would provide free to their clients.

"Song shark" is the trade name for any individual, or firm who, with the deliberate intention to defraud, solicits business from amateur songwriters, advising them that by having music written to their lyrics, or vice versa, they will have a finished composition which will immediately be "snatched up" by a music publisher. Often, the song shark will himself claim to be a publisher, and will tell the songwriter that his only expense will be in "defraying half the costs of publication."

See also
 Song poem
 Vanity press

References
General references
 
 

 Inline citations

Occupations in music
Jazz terminology
Musical terminology